Kevin Gilliam (born April 20, 1968), better known by his stage name Battlecat, is an American hip hop record producer and DJ  from South Los Angeles, California.

Biography
He started out as a battle DJ, notably competing in the 1988 New Music Seminar DJ Battle for World Supremacy and the 1990 DMC US Mixing Finals, both in NYC. He is well known for producing artists such as Snoop Dogg, Tupac Shakur, The Game, Xzibit and Tha Eastsidaz along with a number of other West Coast rappers. His aesthetic is a progression from the early-'90s G-Funk sound pioneered by Above the Law and Dr. Dre, characterized by fat synth bass lines and soulful keys. He is also the concert DJ for Snoop Dogg. As a youth he was a member of the Neighborhood Rollin 60s crip, because of this he has also produced instrumentals for the 1993 album "Bangin' on wax" by rap collaboration Bloods & Crips which went Gold. 

In 2009, Battlecat produced a special song called "A Soldier Never Dies", dedicated to fallen Marine, Anthony Vargas. Battlecat is a DJ member of The Worldwide DJ organization, The Core DJs.
 The music video was directed by Paolo Ongkeko and produced by Don Le. One of the video's leads was portrayed by Sonny Ayon.

Discography

1988: "D.J. N-Effect"
1999: Gumbo Roots
2009: G' & Sexy Vol. 1

References

External links

American hip hop record producers
Businesspeople from Los Angeles
American hip hop DJs
Living people
Maverick Records artists
Record producers from Los Angeles
Crips
1968 births